Dinsoor District is a district in the southern Bay region of Somalia. Its capital is Dinsoor.

References

External links
 Districts of Somalia
 Administrative map of Dinsoor District

Districts of Somalia

Bay, Somalia